Windermere is a rural locality in the Bundaberg Region, Queensland, Australia. In the  Windermere had a population of 184 people.

Geography 
Pemberton is a neighbourhood in the south of the locality.

History 
Windermere State School opened on 1922 and closed on circa 1942.

Barolin Provisional School opened in 1884. On 1 November 1886 it became Barolin State School. It closed in 1974. It was located 14 School Lane on the north-west corner of its intersection with Elliott Heads Road.

In 1995 the Coral Coast Christian Church congregation was established from the Bundaberg Baptist Church. In 2000 the church building was erected.

In the  Windermere had a population of 184 people.

Heritage listings
Windermere has a number of heritage-listed sites, including:
 94 Windermere Road: Sunnyside Sugar Plantation

Amenities 
Coral Coast Christian Church is at 596 Windermere Road.

References

External links 

Wide Bay–Burnett
Bundaberg Region
Localities in Queensland